An arbitration clause is a clause in a contract that requires the parties to resolve their disputes through an arbitration process. Although such a clause may or may not specify that arbitration occur within a specific jurisdiction, it always binds the parties to a type of resolution outside the courts, and is therefore considered a kind of forum selection clause.

Arbitration clauses are frequently paired with class action waivers which prevents contracting parties to file class action lawsuits against each other. In the United States, arbitration clauses also often include a provision which requires parties to waive their rights to a jury trial. All three provisions have attained significant amounts of support and controversy, with proponents arguing that arbitration is equally as fair as courts and a more informal, speedier way to resolve disputes, while opponents of arbitration condemning the clauses for limited appeal options and allowing large corporations to effectively silence claims through "private justice".

Use and enforceability by country

Canada 
All provinces except for Quebec have adopted an arbitration code similar to the United Nations Commission on International Trade Law's Model Law. Quebec has opted instead to require that arbitrations would be subject to the province's own Civil Code, including Quebec's Code of Civil Procedure. Arbitration in Canada is primarily administered by the ADR Institute of Canada and the British Columbia International Commercial Arbitration Centre.

Class action waivers lack a uniform policy across Canada, as the Supreme Court of Canada has found that provincial legislation governed disputes, though in Seidel v. TELUS Communications, the court found that because a class action waiver was attached to an invalid arbitration agreement, the class action waiver was void. The province of Ontario, per the Consumer Protection Act of 2002, has banned class action waivers. A court of appeals in British Columbia also found that class action waivers were unenforceable and unconscionable in Pearce v. 4 Pillars Consulting Group due to the contract in question being a standard form contract written by 4 Pillars and giving little bargaining power to Pearce.

Mainland China 
China allows arbitration clauses to exist, though the Supreme People's Court has found that an arbitration clause that does not specify an "arbitral commission" is invalid and unenforceable. An agreement to arbitrate in China, in addition to specifying a commission, must contain a declared intent to arbitrate as well as name the disputes to be arbitrated in order to be enforceable. In the event that one party questions the validity of an arbitration agreement and requests that a PRC court to determine the validity of the agreement, the court shall determine the validity of the agreement.

France 
French law generally supports arbitration, though declares that capacity, marriage and divorce cannot be arbitrated.

Germany 
German law excludes disputes over the rental of living space from any form of arbitration, while arbitration agreements with consumers are only considered valid if they are signed, and if the signed document does not bear any other content than the arbitration agreement.

England and Wales 

In England and Wales it is not possible for parties to a contract to prevent courts from exercising their jurisdiction over contact disputes, but through what is known as a Scott v. Avery clause they may require that a dispute be adjudicated by an arbitrator before submitting the matter to a court.

United States 

The federal government has expressed a policy in support of arbitration clauses, because they reduce the burden on court systems to resolve disputes. This support is found in the Federal Arbitration Act, which permits compulsory and binding arbitration, under which parties give up the right to appeal an arbitrator's decision to a court.

In 2022, the U.S. Congress passed the Ending Forced Arbitration of Sexual Assault and Sexual Harassment Act (EFASASHA), which excludes these types of complaints from arbitration clauses, including retroactively. Congress also included a ban on class action waivers for claims covered under the act.

Fairness 
The use of arbitration clauses has been criticized for its unfairness. In the US in 2020, workers who challenged their employers through forced arbitration won their cases just 1.6 percent of the time. This prompted members of the United States' Democratic Party to present bills limiting the scope of arbitration clauses, most notably the Forced Arbitration Injustice Repeal Act (which has yet to pass) and the Ending Forced Arbitration of Sexual Assault and Sexual Harassment Act, which was signed into law in 2022 by president Joe Biden.

Contractual language

A number of international arbitration bodies provide sample arbitration clauses for parties to use. Examples of these are:

In keeping with the informality of the arbitration process, the law in England and Wales is generally keen to uphold the validity of arbitration clauses even when they lack the normal formal language associated with legal contracts. Clauses which have been upheld include:
 "arbitration in London – English law to apply"
 "suitable arbitration clause"
 "arbitration, if any, by ICC Rules in London"

Courts in England and Wales have also upheld clauses which specify resolution of disputes other than in accordance with a specific legal system.  These include provision indicating:

 that the arbitrators "must not necessarily judge according to the strict law but as a general rule ought chiefly to consider the principles of practical business"
 "internationally accepted principles of law governing contractual relations"

See also 

 Epic Systems Corp. v. Lewis, a United States Supreme Court case that considers whether arbitration clauses are legal under the National Labor Relations Act
 Class action waiver

Footnotes

External links 
The Arbitration Database

Further reading 

  Gary Born.  International Arbitration and Forum Selection Agreements: Planning, Drafting and Enforcing book (2010)

Contract law
Arbitration
Business law
Contract clauses